Darnley Earl "D.J." Gay (born February 15, 1989) is a retired American professional basketball player. He is a 6 ft 0 in (183 cm) tall point guard. He attended John H. Francis Polytechnic High School and played college basketball at San Diego State.

Pro career
In August 2011, he signed with Slovenian club KK Helios Domžale of the Adriatic League. In September 2012 he signed with Andrea Costa Imola in Italy. In August 2013, he signed with Politekhnika-Halychyna in Ukraine. However, he left them before appearing in a game.

References

External links
 Legadue profile
 San Diego State profile

1989 births
Living people
ABA League players
American expatriate basketball people in Italy
American expatriate basketball people in Slovenia
American men's basketball players
Andrea Costa Imola players
Basketball players from Los Angeles
John H. Francis Polytechnic High School alumni
People from Sun Valley, Los Angeles
Point guards
San Diego State Aztecs men's basketball players
Helios Suns players